Kudalgi is a village in Dharwad district of Karnataka, India.

Demographics 
As of the 2011 Census of India there were 236 households in Kudalgi and a total population of 1,142 consisting of 591 males and 551 females. There were 128 children ages 0-6. The 2022-2023 population estimate is 1,279 - 1,393.

References

Villages in Dharwad district